A reference work is a work, such as a paper, book or periodical (or their electronic equivalents), to which one can refer for information. The information is intended to be found quickly when needed. Such works are usually referred to for particular pieces of information, rather than read beginning to end. The writing style used in these works is informative; the authors avoid use of the first person, and emphasize facts.

Indices are a common navigation feature in many types of reference works. Many reference works are put together by a team of contributors whose work is coordinated by one or more editors, rather than by an individual author. Updated editions are usually published as needed, in some cases annually (Whitaker's Almanack, Who's Who).

Reference works include almanacs, atlases, bibliographies, biographical sources, catalogs such as library catalogs and art catalogs, concordances, dictionaries, directories such as business directories and telephone directories, discographies, encyclopedias, filmographies, gazetteers, glossaries, handbooks, indices such as bibliographic indices and citation indices, manuals, research guides, thesauruses, and yearbooks. Many reference works are available in electronic form and can be obtained as reference software, CD-ROMs, DVDs, or online through the Internet. Wikipedia, an online encyclopedia, is both the largest and the most-read reference work in history.

Reference book
In contrast to books that are loaned, a reference book or reference-only book in a library is one that may only be used in the library and may not be borrowed from the library. Many such books are reference works (in the first sense), which are, usually, used briefly or photocopied from, and therefore, do not need to be borrowed. Keeping reference books in the library assures that they will always be available for use on demand. Some reference-only books are too valuable to permit borrowers to take them out. Reference-only items may be shelved in a reference collection located separately from circulating items. Some libraries consist entirely, or to a large extent, of books which may not be borrowed.

Types of reference work
These are the main types and categories of reference work:

 Abstracting journal – a published summary of articles, theses, reviews, conference proceedings etc. arranged systematically
 Almanac – an annual publication listing a set of current, general or specific, information about one or multiple subjects
 Annals – concise historical record in which events are arranged chronologically
 Atlas – a collection of maps traditionally been bound into book form
 Bibliography – a systematic list of books and other works such as journal articles on a given subject or which satisfy particular criteria
 Biographical dictionary – an encyclopedic dictionary limited to biographical information
 Books of Quotations – collections of quotations satisfying particular criteria, arranged systematically
 Chronicle/Chronology – a historical account of events arranged in chronological order
 Compendium – a concise collection of information pertaining to a body of knowledge 
 Concordance – an alphabetical list of the principal words used in a book or body of work
 Dictionary – a list of words from one or more languages, systematically arranged and giving meanings etymologies etc.
 Digest – a summary of information on a particular subject
 Directory – a systematically arranged list of names, addresses, products, etc.
 Business directory
 Telephone directory
 Web directory
 Encyclopaedia – a compendium providing summaries of knowledge either from all branches or from a particular field or discipline
 Gazetteer – a geographical dictionary or directory used to provide systematic access to a map or atlas
 Glossary – an alphabetical list of terms in a particular domain of knowledge with the definitions for those terms
 Handbook – a small or portable book intended to provide ready reference
 Index – a publication giving systematic access to a body of knowledge
 Lexicon – a synonym for a dictionary or encyclopaedic dictionary
 List – a published enumeration of a set of items 
 Manual – a handbook providing instructions in the use of a particular product
 Phrase book – a collection of ready-made phrases, arranged systematically, usually for a foreign language together with a translation
 Ready reckoner – a printed book or table containing pre-calculated values
 Thematic catalogue – an index used to identify musical compositions through the citation of the opening notes
 Thesaurus – a reference work for finding synonyms and sometimes antonyms of words
 Timetable – a published list of schedules giving times for transportation or other events
 Yearbook – a compendium containing events relating to a specific year

Electronic resources
An electronic resource is a computer program or data that is stored electronically, which is usually found on a computer, including information that is available on the Internet. Libraries offer numerous types of electronic resources including electronic texts such as electronic books and electronic journals, bibliographic databases, institutional repositories, websites, and software applications.

References

Further reading
General

Guides to reference works
  Published annually beginning in 1970.

 Originally compiled by Alice B. Kroeger for first two editions beginning in 1902. Subsequently, edited by Isadore Gilbert Mudge (3rd through 6th editions) and Constance Mabel Winchell (7th and 8th editions).
 First published in 1954.

 (an abridgement of Walford's Guide)

External links